USS Black Hawk was a large steamer purchased by the Union Navy during the American Civil War.

She was assigned by the Union Navy to gunboat duty in the waterways of the rebellious Confederate States of America.

Service history 

Black Hawk, a side-wheel river steamer, was built in 1848 as Uncle Sam at New Albany, Indiana; purchased by the Navy at Cairo, Illinois, November 24, 1862 as New Uncle Sam; commissioned December 6, 1862, Lieutenant Commander K. R. Breese in command; and renamed Black Hawk December 13, 1862.

During most of her service Black Hawk served as flagship for Rear Admiral David Dixon Porter, Captain Alexander Mosely Pennock and Rear Admiral Samuel Phillips Lee, successive commanders of the Mississippi Squadron.

She participated in the Vicksburg campaign that began in December 1862. This included supporting Union forces at the Battle of Arkansas Post (also known as the Battle of Fort Hindman) on 11 January 1863. She next took part in operations off Haines Bluff from 29 April to 2 May. The Vicksburg campaign culminated in the Siege of Vicksburg, which Black Hawk supported; the siege began on 19 May and lasted through 4 July. The ship later participated in the Red River Expedition from 12 March to 29 May 1864.

Thereafter she patrolled in the Mississippi River and its tributaries. On April 22, 1865 she accidentally burned and sank, three miles above Cairo. Her wreck was raised and sold at St. Louis, Missouri, in April 1867.

References 

Ships of the Union Navy
Steamships of the United States Navy
Gunboats of the United States Navy
American Civil War patrol vessels of the United States
Ships built in New Albany, Indiana
Shipwrecks of the American Civil War
Shipwrecks of the Mississippi River
1848 ships
Maritime incidents in April 1865
Ship fires